Bullawarra is a former locality in the Shire of Bulloo, Queensland, Australia.

On 17 April 2020 the Queensland Government reorganised the nine localities in the Shire of Bulloo, resulting in six localities. This included discontinuing the locality of Bullawarra by absorbing most of its land into Thargomindah except for a small portion in the south of Bullawarra which was absorbed into Bulloo Downs.

Geography 
The Bundeena Road passed east to west through the north of the locality. The Bulloo River flowed through the locality from east to south.

Bullawarra was part of the Channel Country where the rivers are mostly dry riverbeds except for seasonal flooding. The land was principally used for low density cattle grazing.

Lake Bullawarra was the east of the locality and is a nationally important wetland. It is a habitat for a vulnerable species, the Major Mitchell's cockatoo.

History

On 17 April 2020 the Queensland Government reorganised the nine localities in the Shire of Bulloo, resulting in six localities. This included discontinuing the locality of Bullawarra by absorbing most of its land into Thargomindah except for a small portion in the south of Bullawarra which was absorbed into Bulloo Downs.

Education 
There were no schools in Bullawarra. The nearest public primary school was in Thargomindah State School and the nearest public secondary school was Cunnamulla P-12 State School.

References 

Shire of Bulloo
Localities in Queensland